James W. Carroll Jr. is an American attorney and government appointee, who served as director of the Office of National Drug Control Policy in the Trump Administration from February 9, 2018 until January 20, 2021. 

After being confirmed by the U.S. Senate on January 2, 2019, he was sworn in by Vice President Mike Pence on January 31. Earlier, Carroll had served as the White House Deputy Chief of Staff. Prior to that he was General Counsel in the Office of Management and Budget, and an attorney in the Office of the White House Counsel for Presidents Donald Trump and George W. Bush.

References

External links

Antonin Scalia Law School alumni
Directors of the Office of National Drug Control Policy
George W. Bush administration personnel
Trump administration personnel
Living people
University of Virginia alumni
Year of birth missing (living people)